Paulo Luiz Campos known as Paulo Campos (born 20 February 1957 in Niterói) is a Brazilian football manager.

Honours
Al Shabab
Saudi Premier League: 1990–91
Arab Super Cup: 2000

Al-Rayyan
Qatar Crown Prince Cup: 2001

Asteras Tripolis
Beta Ethniki: 2006–07

Al-Hilal Omdurman
Sudan Premier League: 2010

References

1957 births
Living people
Sportspeople from Niterói
Brazilian football managers
Campeonato Brasileiro Série A managers
Campeonato Brasileiro Série B managers
Expatriate football managers in Qatar
Expatriate football managers in Saudi Arabia
Expatriate football managers in Greece
Expatriate football managers in Sudan
Calabar Rovers F.C. managers
Kuwait national football team managers
São Cristóvão de Futebol e Regatas managers
Friburguense Atlético Clube managers
Expatriate football managers in Liberia
Liberia national football team managers
Al Shabab FC (Riyadh) managers
Expatriate football managers in the United Arab Emirates
Al Ahli Club (Dubai) managers
Ittihad FC managers
Al-Nasr SC (Dubai) managers
Al-Wasl F.C. managers
Botafogo de Futebol e Regatas managers
Al-Rayyan SC managers
Qatar national football team managers
Al-Sailiya SC managers
Iraty Sport Club managers
Paraná Clube managers
Vila Nova Futebol Clube managers
Fluminense FC managers
Clube Náutico Capibaribe managers
Expatriate football managers in Libya
Asteras Tripolis F.C. managers
Atromitos F.C. managers
Criciúma Esporte Clube managers
Mogi Mirim Esporte Clube managers
Duque de Caxias Futebol Clube managers
Resende Futebol Clube managers
Guaratinguetá Futebol managers
Tupi Football Club managers
Al-Hilal Club (Omdurman) managers
Tupynambás Futebol Clube managers
Fujairah FC managers
Expatriate football managers in Kuwait
Brazilian expatriate sportspeople in Kuwait
Brazilian expatriate sportspeople in Libya
Brazilian expatriate sportspeople in the United Arab Emirates
Brazilian expatriate sportspeople in Qatar
Brazilian expatriate sportspeople in Saudi Arabia
Brazilian expatriate sportspeople in Ghana
Saudi Professional League managers
Qatar Stars League managers
UAE Pro League managers
Brazilian expatriate sportspeople in Liberia
Brazilian expatriate sportspeople in Sudan
Aris Thessaloniki F.C. managers
Brazilian expatriate sportspeople in Greece